Douglas Abbott Macgregor (born January 4, 1947) is a retired U.S. Army colonel and government official, and an author, consultant, and television commentator. He played a significant role on the battlefield in the Gulf War and the 1999 NATO bombing of Yugoslavia. His 1997 book Breaking the Phalanx established him as an influential if unconventional theorist of military strategy. His thinking contributed to the US strategy in its 2003 invasion of Iraq.

After leaving the military in 2004, he became more politically active. In 2020, President Donald Trump proposed Macgregor as ambassador to Germany, but the Senate blocked the nomination. On November 11, 2020, a Pentagon spokesperson announced that Macgregor had been hired to serve as Senior Advisor to the Acting Secretary of Defense, a post he held for less than three months. Trump also appointed him to the board of West Point Academy, his alma mater. These appointments caused controversy due to past racist comments. He regularly contributes to Fox News and Russian state media, where his opinions on Russia and Ukraine have caused controversy. Liz Cheney has called him a member of the "Putin wing of the GOP" and a fellow traveller.

Early life and education
Macgregor was educated at the Wm. Penn Charter School in Philadelphia and at the Virginia Military Institute, and graduated from the U.S. Military Academy at West Point with a BS in general engineering in 1976. He received his Ph.D. from the University of Virginia in international relations in 1987.

Military career

Macgregor was the "squadron operations officer who essentially directed the Battle of 73 Easting" during the Gulf War. Facing an Iraqi Republican Guard opponent, he led a contingent consisting of 19 tanks, 26 Bradley Fighting Vehicles and 4 M1064 mortar carriers through the sandstorm to the 73 Easting at roughly 16:18 hours on 26 February 1991 destroyed almost 70 Iraqi armored vehicles with no U.S. casualties in a 23-minute span of the battle. He was at the front of the formation in the center with Eagle Troop on the right and Ghost Troop on the left. Macgregor designated Eagle Troop the main attack and positioned himself to the left of Eagle Troop. Eagle Troop Scouts subsequently followed Macgregor's tank through a minefield during which his crew destroyed two enemy tanks. As Macgregor was towards the front of the battle involved in shooting, he didn't "request artillery support or report events to superiors until the battle was virtually over, according to one of his superior officers". The risks he undertook "could have been criticized had the fight turned ugly".

At a November 1993 exercise at the Army's National Training Center (NTC) at Fort Irwin, Lt. Col. Macgregor's unit vastly outperformed its peers against the "Opposition Force (OPFOR)". The series of five battles usually end in four losses and a draw for the visiting units; his unit won three, lost one, and drew one. Macgregor's unit dispersed widely, took unconventional risks, and anticipated enemy movements.

Macgregor was "one of the Army's leading thinkers on innovation", according to journalist Thomas E. Ricks. He "became prominent inside the Army" when his book Breaking the Phalanx was published in 1997, arguing for radical reforms. Breaking the Phalanx was rare in that an active duty military author was challenging the status quo with detailed reform proposals for the reorganization of U.S. Army ground forces. The head of the Army, United States General Dennis Reimer, wanted to reform the Army and effectively endorsed Breaking the Phalanx and passed copies out to generals; however, reforming the U.S. Army according to the book met resistance from the Army's de facto "board of directors" — the other four-star Army generals — and Reimer did not press the issue. Breaking the Phalanx advocated that "the Army restructure itself into modularly organized, highly mobile, self-contained, combined arms teams that look extraordinarily like the Marine Corps' Air Ground Task Forces". His article called "Thoughts on Force Design in an Era of Shrinking Defense Budgets" was published in The Dado Center Journal (the IDF's "Journal on Operational Art").

Many of Macgregor's colleagues thought his unconventional thinking may have harmed his chances for promotion. While an Army NTC official called him "the best war fighter the Army has got," colleagues of Macgregor were concerned that "the Army is showing it prefers generals who are good at bureaucratic gamesmanship to ones who can think innovatively on the battlefield." Macgregor was also seen as blunt, and to some, arrogant. Despite his top post-Gulf War NTC showing, his Army career was sidelined. The summer of 1997 marked the third time the Army refused to put him in command of a combat brigade, "a virtual death warrant for his Army career, relegating him to staff jobs as a colonel for the remainder of his service".

Macgregor was the top planner for General Wesley Clark, the military commander of NATO, for its 1999 attack on Serbia.

In the fall of 2001, Secretary of Defense Donald Rumsfeld, who had read Breaking the Phalanx, insisted that General Tommy Franks and his planning staff meet with Colonel Macgregor on 16–17 January 2002 to discuss a concept for intervention in Iraq involving the use of an armored heavy force of roughly 50,000 troops in a no warning attack straight into Baghdad.

Macgregor left the Army in June 2004.

Post-military career
Macgregor is the vice president of Burke-Macgregor, LLC, a consulting firm based in Reston, Virginia.

In 2012, he challenged general James F. Amos' stance on the United States Marine Corps. Macgregor argued that the military capability and pertinence of the Marines, along with Army's XVIII Airborne Corps, made them both "as relevant as the Army's horse cavalry in the 1930s". In 2014, he stated that U.S. Army is designed to benefit four-star generals, not brigade readiness.

Macgregor has appeared as a regular guest on Fox News, with at least 60 Fox weekday appearances from August 2017 to early 2022, including 48 on Tucker Carlson’s show. Carlson regularly praises on Macgregor, describing him as “our first choice for foreign policy analysis” and “one of the people we trust to give us real information". According to Media Matters for America, it was this which got Macgregor on to the radar of President Donald Trump. In May 2019, on the Carlson show, Macgregor urged Trump to replace senior national security officials, describing them as “part of this bipartisan globalist elite”.

When John Bolton was removed from the White House in September 2019, Macgregor was one of five finalists under consideration for selection as President Trump's National Security Advisor.

In 2019, Lieutenant General Aviv Kochavi, Chief of the Israeli Defense Force (IDF) General Staff made MacGregor's 2003 book, Transformation under Fire, required reading for all officers in the rank of Lieutenant Colonel and above. On February 17, 2020, Macgregor traveled to Israel as a guest of the IDF Chief of Staff to meet with the IDF General Staff, and many of his senior officers to discuss General Kohavi's ongoing initiative to transform the IDF for future warfighting missions in the 21st century.

In April 2020, Macgregor was reportedly Trump's second choice candidate to succeed John Rood as undersecretary of defense for policy, a position given instead to fellow Fox contributor Anthony Tata. According to Politico, Defense Secretary Mark Esper expressed reservations about him.

U.S. Ambassador to Germany nomination
On July 27, 2020, the White House announced Donald Trump's intent to nominate Macgregor as U.S. Ambassador to Germany.

Following the announcement, Macgregor's history of controversial remarks received media attention. He had asserted that Muslim immigrants (referred to as "Muslim invaders") come to Europe "with the goal of eventually turning Europe into an Islamic state". Macgregor had argued that the German concept of Vergangenheitsbewältigung, used to cope with Germany's Nazi past and its atrocities during World War II, is a "sick mentality". Macgregor had stated that martial law should be instituted on the U.S.-Mexico border and argued for the extrajudicial execution of those who cross the border at unofficial ports of entry.

In a column in The Washington Post by Max Boot, he was described as "a racist crackpot who is pro-Russia, anti-Merkel, anti-Muslim and anti-Mexican". His nomination stalled in the Senate Committee on Foreign Relations.

On January 3, 2021, his nomination was returned to the President under Rule XXXI, Paragraph 6 of the United States Senate.

Senior Advisor to the Acting Secretary of Defense
On November 11, 2020, a Pentagon spokesperson announced that Macgregor had been hired by President Trump to serve as senior advisor to the new Acting Secretary of Defense Christopher Miller, as part of a sweeping change in senior defence staffing. At the time, Macgregor was an advocate of US withdrawal from Afghanistan, a Trump policy opposed by the defence establishment. His appointment was welcomed by Senator Rand Paul, who described Macgregor as his friend, but was controversial because of his history of racist comments and support for Russia in its geopolitical ambitions. He held the post until Trump left office in January 2021.

West Point appointment
In December 2020, President Trump appointed Macgregor to a three-year term on the advisory board of the United States Military Academy at West Point, his alma mater. Because of his history of racism, the appointment was opposed by West Point's Black alumni organization and board member Tammy Duckworth, among others. The appointment was one of a number terminated by President Joe Biden in September 2021.

Views

On the Iraq War
In 2004, Macgregor stated that he strongly supported war against Iraq, and regretted that the US had not enacted regime change in Iraq in 1991. During the beginning of the Iraq War, Macgregor disagreed with those who wanted to slow the advance into Baghdad in order to fight Fedayeen paramilitary forces. In 2006, after seven retired generals criticized then Defense Secretary Donald Rumsfeld's handling of the war, Macgregor faulted the generals themselves for poor war planning and the resulting complications in Iraq. In 2008, Macgregor stated that he would argue that American military action in Iraq and Afghanistan "has produced very serious and negative consequences for American national-security interests". Macgregor's 2009 book, Warrior's Rage: The Great Tank Battle of 73 Easting, argues that the failure to finish the battle with the Republican Guard in 1991 led to Iraq's second major confrontation with the United States in 2003.

Macgregor says that David Petraeus, Martin Dempsey, and other generals consistently exaggerated or falsified the effectiveness of the Iraqi army because "the generals were simply cultivating their Bush administration sponsors in pursuit of further promotion".

By 2020, his website called the war in Iraq a failure.

On the underclass
In a 2013 radio appearance, Macgregor spoke of an "entitled" "underclass" of people that were concentrated in "large urban areas", and the threat they posed."And when the food stamps stop, when the free services end, when the heating bills aren’t paid and the heating doesn’t come through in many of these large cities—Chicago, Philadelphia, New York, Washington, Baltimore, St. Louis, Detroit, New Orleans, San Francisco, Los Angeles—this underclass that resides in these places, I think could become very violent." In 2019, he argued for the myth that there were more White, mostly Irish "slaves" than African slaves in America in the late 1700s.

On the Kosovo War
In 2014, Macgregor went on Russian state-owned RT to express his opposition to U.S. intervention in the Kosovo War. He described the results of US intervention in Kosovo as to "put, essentially, a Muslim drug mafia in charge of that country".

On NATO
In a 2016 presentation to military students, Macgregor said that "old alliances like NATO may vanish", arguing that it is "time to reexamine U.S. investment in 'allies' that are doing too little to secure their own sovereign interests" and that the "Cold War ended 27 years ago".

On immigration
In 2020, CNN reviewed his public commentary and found he often demonized immigrants and refugees. He warned Mexican cartels were "driving millions of Mexicans with no education, no skills and the wrong culture into the United States, placing them essentially as wards of the American people". He repeatedly advocated instituting martial law at the US-Mexico border and to "shoot people" if necessary.
In 2019, on the Conservative Commandos radio show, Macgregor said that George Soros was financing the transportation of foreigners to the United States to destroy American culture: “The largest problem of all is really a network of people like George Soros, who are committed Marxists, who see the destruction of the United States and of Western Europe as a means to an end of creating what they think will be this global society and the planet... Pretty soon, there won’t be very many Americans left inside the United States if they can ship in enough of these foreigners. And of course, the big falsehood is ‘well, they’ll all become Americans. Just give them time.’ We don’t see much evidence for that right now. In fact, we see the opposite. We see hardcore points of foreign culture that is hostile to the United States, hostile to our values, hostile to our way of life forming across the country. He made similar claims about Soros on Lou Dobbs' Fox show in December 2019. He has described Muslim migrants in Europe as "unwanted invaders", arriving "with the goal of eventually turning Europe into an Islamic state". In April 2021 on Frank Morano's radio show, Macgregor blamed the Democratic Party for immigration:I think some of you must have seen the thousands of pregnant women coming up from Latin America, so they can have their children here — and then, the child immediately is declared an American citizen. And again, all of this is part of the grand plan. This is what Mr. Biden and his supporters want. They want another country. They don't want the United States.

These views were described by MSNBC, Media Matters for America, The Insider and Newsweek as a version of Great Replacement Theory.

On Israel
Macgregor has made statements in support of Israel having defensible borders, the annexation of the Golan Heights, and the decision to move the U.S. embassy to Jerusalem. On several occasions he has said that U.S. support for Israel is due to the "Israeli lobby" making top officials "very, very rich".

On Ukraine and Russia

2014 Russian annexation of Crimea
In 2014, after Russia annexed Crimea and was engaged in a conflict with Ukraine over its eastern parts, Macgregor appeared on Russian state-owned network RT where he called for the annexation of the Donbas and said residents of the region "are in fact Russians, not Ukrainians, and at the same time, you have Ukrainians in the west and in the north, who are not Russians".

2022 Russian invasion of Ukraine
After Russia's invasion of Ukraine in February 2022, Macgregor appeared on three Fox News programs in February and early March to speak in support of Russia's actions. Three days after the war began, he said "The battle in eastern Ukraine is really almost over," and predicted "If [Ukraine] don't surrender in the next 24 hours, I suspect Russia will ultimately annihilate them." Macgregor said he believed Russia should be allowed to seize whatever parts of Ukraine it wanted. In his second appearance, he revised his prediction: "The first five days Russian forces I think frankly were too gentle. They've now corrected that. So, I would say another 10 days this should be completely over... I think the most heroic thing he could do right now is come to terms with reality. Neutralize Ukraine." After one of his appearances, Macgregor's comments were characterized by veteran Fox News Pentagon correspondent Jennifer Griffin as "distorting" and "appeasement" and that he was being an "apologist" for Putin. After Griffin's remarks, Tucker Carlson — who hosted Macgregor on two successive nights — remarked, "Unlike many of the so-called reporters you see on television, he is not acting secretly as a flack for Lloyd Austin at the Pentagon. No, Doug Macgregor is an honest man." Trey Gowdy, another Fox News host who interviewed Macgregor, said his viewpoint was "stunning and disappointing".

Russian state television channels RT and VGTRK broadcast excerpts of Macgregor's second Carlson appearance, which included a characterization of Ukrainian president Volodymyr Zelenskyy as a "puppet," that Russian forces had been "too gentle" in the early days of the invasion and that Russian president Vladimir Putin was being "demonized" by the United States and NATO. U.S. representative Liz Cheney said of Macgregor "This is the Putin wing of the GOP."

In a fourth appearance in early March, Macgregor said a ceasefire was close as Ukrainian forces had been "grounded to bits. There's no question about that despite what we report on our mainstream media". He also defended Russia's invasion in an interview on The Grayzone, saying Putin had taken great care with civilians and this was delaying his victory.

In July 2022, on Real America's Voice he told Charlie Kirk that:"The war, with the exception of Kharkiv and Odessa, as far as the Russians are concerned is largely over. There is no intention to do anything else because the Russians don’t have a very large army... This nonsense that Putin wants to conquer all of Ukraine was never true. All he ever did in the Minsk agreement was ask that Russian speakers, Russian citizens inside Ukraine be treated equally before the law. That they not be penalized for being Russians."In September 2022, he again predicted on Carlson's show that “this war may be over soon” and later in the month "the Ukrainian army is bled white, tens of thousands of Ukrainian troops have been killed or wounded, Ukraine is really on the ropes".  Liz Cheney tweeted in response: "Rupert and Lachlan Murdoch - Why do you continually put Douglas MacGregor on @FoxNews to spread Putin's propaganda and lies? This is absolutely not in America's interest."

On Jews
In an October 2021 speech to the Serbian American Voters Alliance, Macgregor said “We have a huge problem with a class of so-called elites, the people who are wealthy, very wealthy in many cases and they are, as the Russians used to call certain individuals many, many years ago, rootless cosmopolitans... They live above all of this, they have no connection to the country. There is nothing there that holds them in place, and they are largely responsible, in my judgment, for the condition that we are in today,” using a Soviet antisemitic trope.

On women in combat
Macgregor opposes diversity or affirmative action programmes in the military, including women serving in combat. In a 2021 interview, while serving on the West Point board, he said: What we call diversity – in the extreme. In other words, affirmative action programs for every conceivable category of humanity that the left wants to come up with, ” said Macgregor. “Whether it’s someone who is a gender neutral or homosexual or whatever else, the left loves to put us into categories and push this. And the people that went along with it and said, ‘sure, let’s put women into the combat forces. Let’s have women everywhere.’ Let’s do whatever we want to do. We’re going to create this brave new world where everyone is the same. There are no differences, nothing matters. So I think that’s where we are.

Select bibliography
Breaking the Phalanx: A New Design for Landpower in the 21st Century, Westport (CT): Praeger, 1997,  .
Transformation Under Fire: Revolutionizing How America Fights, Westport (CT): Praeger, 2003,  .
Warrior's Rage: The Great Tank Battle of 73 Easting, Annapolis (MD): Naval Institute Press, 2009,  .
 Margin of Victory: Five Battles that Changed the Face of Modern War, Annapolis (MD): Naval Institute Press, 2016, .

References

Sources

Further reading

External links

Douglas Macgregor's webpage
Participated in panel discussion, Facing the Future: Writing on War in the 21st Century at the Pritzker Military Museum & Library
Discussion of his book Warrior's Rage: the Great Tank Battle of the 73 Easting at the Pritzker Military Museum & Library

United States Army personnel of the Gulf War
American military writers
Living people
Recipients of the Defense Superior Service Medal
Recipients of the Meritorious Service Medal (United States)
Trump administration personnel
United States Army colonels
United States Department of Defense officials
United States Military Academy alumni
Virginia Military Institute alumni
William Penn Charter School alumni
1953 births
American people of Scottish descent